The Maple River State Game Area is a protected state game area in the U.S. state of Michigan. Governed by the Michigan Department of Natural Resources, the area is considered the state's longest contiguous wetland complex.

The game area contains the only known salt marsh (classified as an inland salt marsh) in the state of Michigan.

Location
Its easternmost sections lies within Elba Township in Gratiot County and also contains areas in the county to the west in Washington Township and Fulton Township. Going southwest, the game area contains portions of Lebanon Township and Essex Township within Clinton County. A small isolated portion denotes the westernmost portion of the game area within Lyons Township in Ionia County.

The area once contained numerous industrial factories and small settlements, but most have disappeared over time. The only incorporated settlement located directly within the state game area is the small village of Maple Rapids in Essex Township. In Washington Township, U.S. Highway 127 (US 127) passes through the area with a large marshland on both sides. The artificially created marshland is referred to as the Maple River Flooding. The city of St. Johns is to the south on US 127, and Ithaca is to the north. No other major roadways pass through the area, although there are numerous local roads and bridges.

The two are loosely connected by the small Maple River / Gratiot–Saginaw Connector State Game Area, which intends to connect the two areas into one continuous state game area.

Wildlife
The Maple River State Game Area has a diverse environment consisting of old forests, wetlands, and grasslands centered along the Maple River. The game area is noted for its large bird populations, as well as an abundance of rabbits, turtles, deer, possums, coyotes, turkeys, snakes, and numerous rodents, such as muskrats, porcupines, squirrels, chipmunks, and beavers. The Friends of the Maple River—a citizen organization aimed at promoting the river—notes a small presence of reintroduced black bears.  The Maple River is also a popular fishing destination. The river includes many common fish, including black crappie, bluegill, smallmouth and largemouth bass, northern pike, pumpkinseed, rock bass, yellow perch, bullhead and channel catfish, and bowfin. The Maple River is dammed in several locations, but none are within the river's course in the state game area.

Water levels along the river and surrounding wetlands have started to dry up in recent years, leading to a sharp drop in the number of some animals. From 2010 to 2015, the area underwent an extensive restoration project to improve the depleting wetlands to provide a more hospitable animal refuge to accommodate increasing animal populations. The project increased water levels through a new water pumping system, upgraded miles of levees and hiking paths, and built boat launches for river access.  The project was supported by a grant from the U.S. Fish and Wildlife Service with contributions from Ducks Unlimited.

Birds
The Maple River State Game Area is popular among numerous bird species as a living or breeding environment. The following is a list of known bird species within the state game area, according to the National Audubon Society.

Bald eagle
Bobolink
Canada goose
Caspian tern
Great blue heron
Great egret
Green heron
Least sandpiper
Lesser yellowlegs
Marsh wren
Northern harrier
Osprey
Pectoral sandpiper
Ring-necked duck
Rough-legged hawk
Rusty blackbird
Sandhill crane
Semipalmated sandpiper
Short-billed dowitcher
Short-eared owl
Solitary sandpiper
Sora
Trumpeter swan
Tundra swan
Wood duck

According to Birdwatching Magazine, the great horned owl, least bittern, prothonotary warbler, red-headed woodpecker, red-tailed hawk, and "the vast majority of Michigan's inland ducks" can also be found within the state game area. Even rarer species of birds can be found, including Hudsonian godwit, Eurasian wigeon, snowy egret, and king rail.

Activities
The Maple River State Game Area is a popular fishing destination along the Maple River. Navigating the river is most suited for smaller vessels, such as canoes and kayaks. While it provides numerous shore fishing locations, there are four public access boat ramps along the river: Maple Road in Fulton Township, Dean Road in Washington Township, and two in Lebanon Township (French Road and Fitzpatrick Road).

As a state game area, camping in non-designated areas is prohibited. The only public campground within Maple River State Game Area is the privately owned Maple River Campground in Lebanon Township in the southwestern portion along the Maple River.  Numerous parking lots are dotted throughout the game area for day use. Seasonal hunting is permitted in various locations of the park, and common game include deer hunting, waterfowl hunting, turkey hunting, and small game trapping. Fishing is permitted year round. A small section within Washington Township east of US 127 is designated as a wildlife refuge, prohibits hunting, and is only accessible at certain times of the year (off limits from September 1 to December 1).  Hiking, birdwatching, and photography are also popular activities. The game area includes several miles of marked trails.

References

Protected areas of Clinton County, Michigan
Protected areas of Gratiot County, Michigan
Protected areas of Ionia County, Michigan
State game areas of Michigan
Birdwatching sites in the United States
Wetlands of Michigan